Vayu is a primary Hindu deity

Vayu may also refer to:
Vayu-Vata, a Zoroastrian divinity
Vayu Stuti, one of the most famous stutis (poems) composed by Sri Trivikrama Panditacharya
Cyclone Vayu, a strong tropical cyclone in the 2019 North Indian Ocean cyclone season that affected Gujarat, India
Tanishk-Vayu, a duo of Indian film score composers
 Vayu, Indian Playback singer and lyricist
Vayu (computer cluster), an Australian computer system located in Canberra, Australia